Susan Cooper (born 24 June 1963) is a British swimmer. She competed in the women's 100 metre butterfly at the 1980 Summer Olympics.

References

External links
 

1963 births
Living people
British female swimmers
Olympic swimmers of Great Britain
Swimmers at the 1980 Summer Olympics
Place of birth missing (living people)
Female butterfly swimmers